The women's hammer throw event at the 2015 Summer Universiade was held on 9 July at the Gwangju Universiade Main Stadium.

Results

References

Hammer
2015 in women's athletics
2015